Sunrise, also known as MacCorkle Mansion, is a historic home located at Charleston, West Virginia.  It was
built in 1905 by West Virginia's ninth governor, William A. MacCorkle (1857-1930). It is a long, three-story stone mansion. Its gabled roof is dotted with dormers and chimneys and surmounts an intricate, but wide, cornice
which gives the illusion that the house is smaller than it actually is.  The Georgian structure rests on a bluff overlooking the Kanawha River, and from the northern portico one can see nearly the entire city of Charleston.  The north side features four magnificent Doric, or neo-classic, columns
which support the cornice and ashlar-finished pediment. In 1961 Sunrise Foundation, Inc., was formed for the purpose of purchasing the mansion and grounds.

It was listed on the National Register of Historic Places in 1974.

The mansion was the former home of the Sunrise Museum, a science and art museum that became the Avampato Discovery Museum when it moved into the Clay Center for the Arts and Sciences - West Virginia when it opened in 2003.  Currently the house is privately owned and is not open to the public.

Gallery

References

External links

Houses in Charleston, West Virginia
Houses completed in 1905
Houses on the National Register of Historic Places in West Virginia
National Register of Historic Places in Charleston, West Virginia
Stone houses in West Virginia
1905 establishments in West Virginia
Historic American Buildings Survey in West Virginia
Neoclassical architecture in West Virginia
Georgian Revival architecture in West Virginia
Greek Revival architecture in West Virginia